Northwest High School is a public high school in Jackson, Michigan, United States. It serves grades 9-12 for the Northwest Community Schools district.

Demographics
The demographic breakdown of the 906 students enrolled for 2017-18 was:
Male - 50.9%
Female - 49.1%
Asian - 0.7%
Black - 3.4%
Hispanic - 4.3%
Native Hawaiian/Pacific islanders - 0.5%
White - 85.5%
Multiracial - 5.6%

43.8% of the students were eligible for free or reduced-cost lunch.

Athletics
The Northwest Mounties compete in the Interstate 8 Athletic Conference. Red and black are the school colors. The following Michigan High School Athletic Association (MHSAA) sports are offered:

Baseball (boys) 
Basketball (girls and boys) 
Bowling (girls and boys) 
Girls state champion - 2013
Competitive cheerleading (girls) 
Cross country (girls and boys) 
Football (boys) 
Golf (girls and boys) 
Gymnastics (girls) 
Ice hockey (boys)
Soccer (girls and boys) 
Softball (girls) 
Tennis (girls and boys) 
Track and field (girls and boys) 
Volleyball (girls) 
Wrestling (boys)

References

External links

School district website

Educational institutions established in 1954
Public high schools in Michigan
Schools in Jackson County, Michigan
1954 establishments in Michigan